Atwoods Ranch & Home is a farm and ranch supply store chain based in Enid, Oklahoma, United States. Atwoods has 66 stores in five states: Arkansas, Kansas, Missouri, Oklahoma and Texas. Nearly half of its stores are located in Oklahoma. In addition to farm and ranch supplies, Atwoods stores sell clothing, lawn and garden items, tools, hardware, automotive supplies, sporting goods, pet supplies, firearms, and seasonal items.

History
After relocating to Enid from Marshall, Minnesota, Wilbur and Fern Atwood founded the store in 1960, selling farm, ranch, home and auto supplies. Today the company is run by their grandson, Brian Atwood.

Atwoods operates two distribution centers, in Enid and in Tyler, Texas.

References

External links
Official website

Farm and ranch supply stores of the United States
Companies based in Oklahoma
Retail companies established in 1960
Enid, Oklahoma
1960 establishments in Oklahoma
Agriculture companies established in 1960
American companies established in 1960